Baalu Jenu is a 1976 Indian Kannada-language film directed by Balan and Kunigal Nagabhushan. It is a remake of the 1976 Tamil film Mayangukiral Oru Maadhu. The film stars Aarathi, Gangadhar, Ramgopal, Rajinikanth, Udaya Chandrika and Pandari Bai. In Baalu Jenu, a married woman must try to keep a one-night stand that she had in college a secret from her husband, and thwart a persistent blackmailer intent on collecting money from her to keep quiet about it. It was released on 10 December 1976, and became a commercial success.

Plot 
Geetha, an oestrogen-charged college student in Mysore, has a one-night stand with Chandru, whose advances she succumbed to. Chandru is arrested on suspicion of abetting his father in smuggling and is sentenced to five years in prison. Geetha futilely tries to find Chandru and then consumes poison, fearing she might be pregnant. Her hostel roommate Revathi and a doctor save her on time. After Geetha graduates, her marriage is arranged; to her surprise, the prospective groom's elder sister is the same doctor who saved her life and knows her secret. The doctor wholeheartedly recommends Geetha for her brother Ravi, a wealthy businessman. Ravi and Geetha get married and have a child.

Some years later, Geetha runs into Revathi at a sari shop. Revathi is married to Vasu, a photographer, and they too have a child. Vasu is the photographer who earlier blackmailed Chandru's father as he has pictures of him in flagrante delicto. Revathi and Vasu visit Ravi and Geetha for a meal. Vasu takes photographs of the family. While developing the pictures, Vasu recalls Geetha's features; he had earlier clicked Geetha and Chandru during their amorous tryst and had been blackmailing Chandru before the latter got arrested.

Chandru is released from prison, and to Geetha's horror, Ravi hires him to be their driver. Vasu begins blackmailing Geetha and his financial demands increase. He also has altercations with Chandru. Geetha cannot cope with the mental and financial strain; she has a breakdown and is hospitalised. Chandru raids Vasu's darkroom, hoping to retrieve the damning negatives. In the ensuing fracas, Revathi bursts in and threatens to immolate herself and her child. Faced with the threat of losing his family before his very eyes, Vasu destroys the incriminating negatives and redeems himself. At the hospital, Ravi tells Geetha that he had full knowledge of the Chandru affair all along.

Cast 
 Aarathi as Geetha
 Gangadhar as Ravi
 Ramgopal as Chandru
 Rajinikanth as Vasu
 Udaya Chandrika as Revathi
 Pandari Bai as the doctor

Production 
Baalu Jenu is a remake of the 1976 Tamil film Mayangukiral Oru Maadhu. It was directed by Balan and Kunigal Nagabhushan, and produced by K. R. Ravichandran under S G S Films. Co-director Nagabhushan also wrote the screenplay. Cinematography was handled by T. M. Sundara Babu, and editing by P. K. Krishnan. Rajinikanth, after watching Thengai Srinivasan's performance in the original film as a blackmailing photographer, expressed his desire to reprise that role and duly got it. Baalu Jenu was also the first film where a character played by Rajinikanth had a major onscreen fight sequence.

Themes 
Film critic Naman Ramachandran noted numerous parallels between Rajinikanth's character Vasu in Baalu Jenu and his character Prasad in Moondru Mudichu (1976). He also compared it to many other earlier Rajinikanth films such as Apoorva Raagangal (1975), Munithaayi (a segment of the 1976 anthology film Katha Sangama), Anthuleni Katha (1976) and Moondru Mudichu due to the fact that they focused on a central female character.

Soundtrack 
The soundtrack was composed by G. K. Venkatesh, with lyrics by Kunigal Nagabhushanam and R. N. Jayagopal.

Release 
Baalu Jenu was released on 10 December 1976. The film became a commercial success, and Rajinikanth went on to play more negative roles in films.

See also 
 Yavvanam Katesindi
 Bezubaan

References

Bibliography

External links 
 

1970s Kannada-language films
1976 films
Films scored by G. K. Venkatesh
Indian black-and-white films
Kannada remakes of Tamil films